A Daughter of Australia is a 1912 Australian silent film directed by Gaston Mervale starring Louise Lovely, then known as Louise Carbasse. It was set in the early days of the Australian goldfields and is considered a lost film.

Release
The film made its premiere at the Alhambra Theatre in Sydney and was screening in cinemas as late as 1918, by which stage the star was billed as "Louise Lovely".

It was advertised as featuring "sensations from beginning to end, mingled with Love, Pathos, Humour, and Tragedy."

References

External links

1912 films
Australian drama films
Australian black-and-white films
Australian silent feature films
Lost Australian films
1912 drama films
1912 lost films
Lost drama films
Films directed by Gaston Mervale
Silent drama films
1910s English-language films